Valathungal or Valathumgal is a neighbourhood and suburb of Kollam city in the Indian state of Kerala. It is the 30th ward in Kollam Municipal Corporation. Valathungal is a fairly densely populated area of the city. Eravipuram railway station is very close to Valathungal.

Importance
Valathungal lies close to the city's major transportation hubs. The presence of a significant number of schools and religious worship centres in the area have increased Valathungal's importance among the neighbourhoods of Kollam. The government  VHSS and Boys High School are two of the important schools in the locality.

There were previously two different municipal councils for the huge Valathungal area (Valathungal West and Valathungal East), which in 2005 merged to form a single council. Valathungal council is in the Eravipuram zone of Kollam Municipal Corporation. The Eravipuram Government Homoeo Pharmacy is located in Valathungal.

Location
 Chinnakada - 
 Kollam Junction railway station - 
 Pallimukku - 
 Kollam Port - 8.7 km
 Paravur -

References

Neighbourhoods in Kollam